Rule is an English surname. Notable people with the name include: 

 Albert Leroy Rule (1886–1943), World War I documentary film producer and director
 Amiria Rule (born 1983), New Zealand rugby player
 Ann Rule (1935–2015), American true crime writer
 Bert L. Rule (1891–1878), Popular music composer and arranger
 Bob Rule (1944–2019), American basketball player 
 Christopher Rule (1895–1983), American comic book artist
 Elton Rule (1916–1990), American television executive
 Francis Rule (1835–1925), Cornish miner who moved to Mexico and became immensely wealthy
 Gilbert Rule (c. 1629–1701), Principal of Edinburgh University
 Glenn Rule (born 1989), English soccer player
 Ja Rule (born 1976), American rapper, singer and actor
 Jack Rule Jr. (born 1938), American professional golfer
 Jane Rule (1931–2007), Canadian writer
 Janice Rule (1931–2003), American actress
 Kevin James Rule (born 1941), Australian botanist
 Margaret Rule (1928-2015), English underwater archaeologist
 Stan Rule (1924-2007), Australian rules footballer
 Stephen Rule (born 1952), English Rugby Union and Rugby League player and coach 
 Wendy Rule (born 1966), Australian musical artist
 William Rule (American editor) (1839–1928), American newspaper editor and politician

See also
Rhule, surname
Rühle, surname